The Stolma Bridge is a road bridge over the Stolmasundet strait in Austevoll municipality, Vestland county, Norway. It connects the islands of Stolmen and Selbjørn. The bridge was opened for traffic 14 November 1998 and is part of County Road 5138. The main span was the world's longest cantilever box-girder span until it was surpassed by the Shibanpo Second Yangtze River Bridge in China.

Bridge design
The short end spans which cantilever the main span are ballasted with gravel.

See also 
 List of longest cantilever bridges
 List of bridges in Norway

References

Road bridges in Vestland
Austevoll